Take the Week Off is the fourth studio album by Canadian country music artist Deric Ruttan. It was released on October 15, 2013 by Black T Records/Universal Music Canada. Ruttan wrote or co-wrote all twelve tracks.

Critical reception
Shenieka Russell-Metcalf of Top Country gave the album four stars out of five, writing that "the twelve track album delivers some real good tunes."

Track listing

Chart performance

Singles

References

2013 albums
Deric Ruttan albums
Universal Music Canada albums